

Kurt Freiherr von Liebenstein (28 February 1899 – 3 August 1975) was a German general during World War II.

On 10 May 1943, he was awarded the Knight's Cross of the Iron Cross. Three days later, while commanding the 164th Infantry Division, he surrendered to the Allied forces in Tunisia. He was sent to  Trent Park, a camp for high-ranking commanders north of London. In 1955, he joined the Bundeswehr. In 1960, he retired as Generalmajor.

Awards and decorations

 Knight's Cross of the Iron Cross on 10 May 1943 as Generalmajor and commander of 164. Leichte Afrika Division

Notes

References

 

1899 births
1975 deaths
People from Horb am Neckar
People from the Kingdom of Württemberg
German Army personnel of World War I
Barons of Germany
Major generals of the German Army (Wehrmacht)
Bundeswehr generals
Recipients of the clasp to the Iron Cross, 2nd class
Recipients of the Gold German Cross
Recipients of the Knight's Cross of the Iron Cross
Recipients of the Silver Medal of Military Valor
Commanders Crosses of the Order of Merit of the Federal Republic of Germany
German prisoners of war in World War II held by the United Kingdom
Major generals of the German Army
Military personnel from Baden-Württemberg
German Army generals of World War II